Serra da Estrela cheese (Queijo Serra da Estrela) is a cheese made in the mountainous region of Serra da Estrela in Portugal. Under the name "Queijo Serra da Estrela" it is a Protected designation of origin (PDO) in the European Union as well as the UK.

Manufacturing
The production of the cheese has to follow very rigorous rules. It is made from sheep's milk, mostly during the months of November to March. Its maturation period has specific norms and must last a minimum of thirty days. The texture of the paste varies depending on its age, from a very soft semi-liquid when young, to a soft but sliceable solid when older. It is a cured cheese created by artisanal producers with a white or slightly yellow color and a uniform creamy consistency with at most a few small holes in it. Its particular qualities result from slow draining of curdled raw sheep's milk which has been coagulated by using local Cynara cadunculus thistle rather than rennet.

The cheese is formed into a somewhat irregular wheel with slightly bulging sides and upper surface. It typically has a soft well-formed rind, smooth and thin with a uniform straw-yellow colour and is traditionally bound in cloth.

Ark of Taste
In 2014, the Serra da Estrela Cheese was boarded in the international catalogue of endangered heritage foods named Ark of Taste which is maintained by the global Slow Food movement.

See also
 List of Portuguese cheeses with protected status

References

Portuguese cheeses
Portuguese products with protected designation of origin
Sheep's-milk cheeses
Cheeses with designation of origin protected in the European Union
Serra da Estrela